This is a list of the busiest airports by passenger traffic in Latin America since 2008.

In graph

2023

Latin America 30 busiest airports by passenger traffic (JAN-JAN)

2022

Latin America 30 busiest airports by passenger traffic

2021

Latin America 25 busiest airports by passenger traffic

2020

Latin America 25 busiest airports by passenger traffic

2019

Latin America 25 busiest airports by passenger traffic

2018

Latin America 25 busiest airports by passenger traffic

2017

Latin America 15 busiest airports by passenger traffic

2016

Latin America 15 busiest airports by passenger traffic

2015

Latin America 10 busiest airports by passenger traffic

2014

Latin America 10 busiest airports by passenger traffic

2013

Latin America 10 busiest airports by passenger traffic

2012

Latin America 20 busiest airports by passenger traffic

2011

Latin America 20 busiest airports by passenger traffic

2010

Latin America 20 busiest airports by passenger traffic

2009

Latin America 20 busiest airports by passenger traffic

2008

Latin America 15 busiest airports by passenger traffic

See also
List of the busiest airports in Mexico
List of the busiest airports in Central America
List of the busiest airports in the Caribbean
List of the busiest airports in South America

References

Latin America
Latin America-related lists

de:Liste der Verkehrsflughäfen in Südamerika
pt:Lista dos aeroportos mais movimentados da América Latina